The ABC Television Network is an American television network. The network currently has eight owned-and-operated stations and current affiliation agreements with 236 other television stations. This is a table listing of ABC's affiliates, with ABC-owned stations separated from privately-owned affiliates, and arranged in alphabetical order by the station's city of license. There are links to and articles on each of the stations, describing their local programming, hosts and technical information, such as broadcast frequencies

The station's virtual (PSIP) channel number follows the call letters. The number in parentheses that follows is the station's actual digital channel number.

Notes:
1) Two boldface asterisks appearing following a station's call letters (**) indicate a station that was built and signed-on by ABC;
2) Two boldface plus signs appearing following a station's call letters (++) indicate a station that was owned by Capital Cities Communications prior to its acquisition of ABC in 1986

Owned-and-operated stations 

Stations are listed alphabetically by state and city of license. Owned-and-operated stations broadcasting on digital subchannels are italicized.

Affiliate stations 
Stations are arranged in alphabetical order by city of license. Affiliates broadcasting on digital subchannels are italicized.

U.S. territories

Outside the U.S.

Footnotes

See also
Lists of ABC television affiliates
Lists of NBC television affiliates
Lists of CBS television affiliates

 
ABC
ABC television affiliates